Scott McQuaig (born January 27, 1959, in Meridian, Mississippi) is an American country music singer-songwriter. In 1989, McQuaig charted two singles on the Billboard Hot Country Singles & Tracks chart. A third single charted on the RPM Country Tracks chart in Canada in 1990.

Discography

Albums

Singles

Notes:
A "Old Memory" did not chart on Hot Country Songs, but peaked at No. 6 on Hot Country Radio Breakouts.

Music videos

References

American country singer-songwriters
American male singer-songwriters
Living people
1959 births
Americana musicians
Musicians from Meridian, Mississippi
Singer-songwriters from Mississippi
Country musicians from Mississippi